New Eastern Bus Station (Vietnamese: Bến xe Miền Đông mới) is the largest bus station in Vietnam, located in Dĩ An, Bình Dương Province. The station opened in April 2020, and is aimed at reducing congestion at the Eastern Bus Station in Binh Thanh District.

During the first three months, the old station would remain open and the new station was only used by long distance routes of over 1,100 km.

In March 2021, VnExpress reported that in one week, just 360 passengers used the station. On an average day, only 20 buses departed from the station. The 17 km distance from the old bus station near the city center, combined with lacking connections to the station, led passengers to avoid the new station. The adjacent metro station was still a year away from opening.

References 

Buildings and structures in Ho Chi Minh City
Transport in Ho Chi Minh City